Metaphors We Live By is a book by George Lakoff and Mark Johnson published in 1980. The book suggests metaphor is a tool that enables people to use what they know about their direct physical and social experiences to understand more abstract things like work, time, mental activity and feelings.

Concepts 
Conceptual metaphor, and a detailed examination of the underlying processes, was first extensively explored in this book. Since then, the field of metaphor studies within the larger discipline of cognitive linguistics has increasingly developed, with several annual academic conferences, scholarly societies, and research labs contributing to the subject area. Some researchers, such as Gerard Steen, have worked to develop empirical investigative tools for metaphor research, including the metaphor identification procedure, or MIP. In Psychology, Raymond W. Gibbs, Jr., has investigated conceptual metaphor and embodiment through a number of psychological experiments. Other cognitive scientists, for example Gilles Fauconnier, study subjects similar to conceptual metaphor under the labels "analogy", "conceptual blending" and "ideasthesia".

Conceptual metaphors are seen in language in our everyday lives. Conceptual metaphors shape not just our communication, but also shape the way we think and act. In George Lakoff and Mark Johnson's work, Metaphors We Live By (1980), we see how everyday language is filled with metaphors we may not always notice. An example of one of the commonly used conceptual metaphors is "argument is war".

Applications 
Since its publication, people have used the ideas Lakoff and Johnson proposed to comment on a wide range of topics, from the COVID-19 pandemic in the United States to conspiracy theories.

Related

References

Cognitive science literature
Books about metaphors
Books about persuasion
1980 non-fiction books
University of Chicago Press books
Collaborative non-fiction books